Giannis Angelopoulos (born 3 April 1998) is a Greek professional footballer who plays as a goalkeeper for Super League club Levadiakos.

Honours
Levadiakos
Super League 2: 2021–22

References

1998 births
Living people
Greek footballers
Greek expatriate footballers
Greece youth international footballers
Super League Greece players
Cypriot First Division players
Super League Greece 2 players
Olympiacos F.C. players
Pafos FC players
Levadiakos F.C. players
Expatriate footballers in Cyprus
Association football goalkeepers
People from Messenia